This is a list of public art in Cameroon. This list applies only to works of public art accessible in an outdoor public space. For example, this does not include artwork  visible inside a museum.